BB Brunes is a French rock band, part of the "new French rock scene" (la nouvelle scène rock française).

In 2000, Adrien Gallo, Karim Réveillé and Raphaël Delorme, childhood friends, formed the band "Hangover" with songs exclusively in English.

Some years later, Raphaël left the band at the moment when they were signing their first contract. The new lineup found a new guitarist, Félix Hemmen, who enjoyed their music. In 2007,  the bassist Bérald Crambes joined the band.

In 2005 they participated at the Emergenza music festival in Paris until the final.

The band took the name BB Brunes, inspired by the name of the song "Initials BB" by Serge Gainsbourg and by Paris's boulevard Brune, where the band then did their rehearsals. The band's musical influences are punk and rock groups from the 1960s and 1970s as well as current groups such as The Strokes, Amy Winehouse, The Clash, David Bowie, Ray Charles and singers like Serge Gainsbourg, Jacques Dutronc, Herbert Léonard, etc.   Their lyrics are mostly in French.

In 2009, the group won a Victoires de la musique in the category 'Group or artist stage revelation of the year'. The band went on hiatus in 2014 and Gallo released his debut solo album that year. The group reunited in 2017.

Members

Adrien Gallo
Adrien Gallo (born 2 July 1989) is the lead vocalist of the band. He is a singer, songwriter and an actor. He is son of Jean-Pierre Gallo, director, producer and scriptwriter for French television and of Latifa Benaoudia of Algerian origin.

He has also recorded solo and wrote a number of songs, notably for the French musical comedy Dracula, l'amour plus fort que la mort notably En transe...ylvanie interpreted by Gregory Deck. He has also written Boxing Club for Alizée and Mi amor and La Marée for Vanessa Paradis and Playground and Exit for singer Sophie-Tith after her appearance in season 9 of Nouvelle Star in France. In 2014 he released his début album Gemini, in collaboration with Ella Waldmann, a friend since 2007. Monokini and Crocodile were promoted as singles from the album.

He has appeared in a number of films and French television series:
2001: L'Instit as Raphi (TV series)
2001: L'Ami Fritz of Jean-Louis Lorenzi (TV film)
2002: La Victoire des vaincus as a migrant youth (TV film by Nicolas Picard)
2002: Julie Lescaut (TV series)
2002: Patron sur mesure as Stanislas (TV film by Stéphane Clavier)
2003: Les Enfants de Charlotte as Pierre (TV film by François Luciani)
2012: JC comme Jésus Christ as a street fan (film by Jonathan Zaccaï)
2012: Astérix et Obélix : Au service de sa Majesté as a bard (film by Laurent Tirard)

Karim Réveillé
Karim Réveillé  (born 14 December 1987 in Paris) is the drummer of the band. He was born to a West Indian father and an Algerian mother. In 2012, he also appeared as a bard in Asterix and Obelix: God Save Britannia (French: Astérix et Obélix: Au service de Sa Majesté)

Félix Hemmen
Félix Hemmen (born 16 November 1989 in Paris) is the lead guitarist and singer of the band. He started playing the piano at age of 9 and at age 14 picked the guitar. Knowing closely the band members of Hangover started by Adrien Gallo, Karim Réveillé and Raphaël Delorme. When Delorme left as guitarist, Félix Hemmen replaced him as guitarist of the new band BB Brunes. In addition to his membership in the band, he has been part of NoSound, a punk music project with his cousin Jonathan.

Bérald Crambes
Bérald Crambes (born 5 May 1987 in Saint-Georges-de-Didonne, Charente-Maritime) is the bass player of the band. He joined the band in 2007 after the release of the album Blonde comme moi after he read an announcement on BB Brunes MySpace site for a bass player for the band and was chosen of all applicants.

Discography

Albums 

Live albums
2011: Nico teen Live (reached #101 in SNEP French Singles Charts)

EPs
2010: BB Brunes EP (English EP)

Singles

Music videos
 "Le Gang" (2006)
 "Dis-moi" (2007)
 "Lalalove You" (2009)
 "Nico Teen Love" (2010)
 "Britty Boy" (2010)
 "Cul & Chemise"
 "Coups et blessures" (2012)
 "Stéréo" (2012)
 "Aficionado" (2013)
 "Bye Bye" (2013)
" Eclair Eclair " (2017)

" Terrain vague / Pyromane (2017)

Rock Band Music Gaming Platform
The song Dis-moi was made available to download on December 21, 2010 for use in the Rock Band 3 music gaming platform in both Basic rhythm, and PRO mode which allows use of a real guitar / bass guitar, and MIDI compatible electronic drum kits / keyboards in addition to vocals.

References

French rock music groups
French garage rock groups
Musical groups established in 2006
Musical groups from Paris